Lago Nero (Italian for "black lake") is a lake in the Province of Pistoia, Tuscany, Italy. At an elevation of 1730 m, its surface area is 0.08 km².

Lakes of Tuscany
Province of Pistoia